3-PPP (N-n-propyl-3-(3-hydroxyphenyl)piperidine) is a mixed sigma σ1 and σ2 receptor agonist (with similar affinity for both subtypes, though slightly higher affinity for the latter) and D2 receptor partial agonist which is used in scientific research. It shows stereoselectivity in its pharmacodynamics. (+)-3-PPP is the enantiomer that acts as an agonist of the sigma receptors; it is also an agonist of both D2 presynaptic and postsynaptic receptors. Conversely, (–)-3-PPP, also known as preclamol, acts as an agonist of presynaptic D2 receptors but as an antagonist of postsynaptic D2 receptors, and has antipsychotic effects. 3-PPP has also been reported to be a monoamine reuptake inhibitor and possibly to act at adrenergic receptors or some other non-sigma receptor.

See also
 4-PPBP
 Alazocine
 OSU-6162
 PF-219,061

References

Antipsychotics
D2 antagonists
Dopamine agonists
Phenols
Piperidines
Sigma agonists